Railadevi Lake (or Railadevi Talav) is an  lake situated in the city of Thane in the state of Maharashtra, India.  It is one of 35 lakes in Thane, which is known as the "city of lakes". Raila Devi Lake is located on Road number 4, Wagle Estate, Raheja Gardens, Thane. The lake is about 3. 3 km away from Thane railway station which is the nearest railway station.

This lake is less known to the people so it is a less crowded place. The place is famous among the visitors for its serene atmosphere. It is photogenic place with lush greenery, so one can capture some beautiful moments here. One can also enjoy boating in the lake which is an enthralling experience.

Raila Devi Lake is an ideal spot for picnic and the weather and altitude is perfect for camping. It is here that people from all age groups come to enjoy the scenery. With an approximate area of 8 hectares, being at the heart of the city and having a rich history, it is an ideal destination for leisure activities for the locals. There are lot of fishes in the lake and is visited frequently by aquatic birds. There are aquatic plants growing over the lake. A walkway has also been built on the lake to get a better view.

Raila Devi Lake can be visited during timings 10:00 AM – 5:00 PM. There is no entry fee and one can visit this place on any day.

References

Geography of Thane district
Lakes of Maharashtra
Lakes of Thane